Motion Theory was an American production company founded on 1 May 2000 by Mathew Cullen and Javier Jimenez. The company was located in Marina Del Rey in Los Angeles, California, United States. The company produced hundreds of projects and was awarded multiple Grammys, MTV Video Music Awards and AICP Awards for its commercial and music video production work. Its director roster included Mathew Cullen, Bo Krabbe, Guillermo del Toro, Jesus de Francisco, Christopher Leone, Clement Oberto, Daniel Reisinger, Lucas Borras, Marlind & Stein, Chris Riehl, Vanessa Marzaroli and Syyn Labs. Motion Theory's notable work includes commercials for Audi, HP, IBM, Samsung, Nike, NFL; and music videos for Adele, Weezer, The Black Eyed Peas and Katy Perry. Motion Theory held the Guinness World Record for the most internet memes in a music video, 51 featured in Weezer's Pork and Beans. The video was directed by Cullen and produced by Javier Jimenez and Bernard Rahill.

History

In August 2010 Motion Theory moved their company headquarters from Venice, CA to an expanded  space in Marina del Rey in Los Angeles, CA.

On December 9, 2010, Guillermo del Toro, cinematographer Guillermo Navarro, Mathew Cullen and Javier Jimenez launched Mirada Studios, a sister company to Motion Theory. Mirada is a story development, digital production and visual effects company made up of animators, designers, digital artists, writers and filmmakers. The team works collaboratively to create and produce projects that span digital production and content for film, television, advertising, interactive and other media.

In January 2017 Motion Theory sought bankruptcy protection leaving numerous vendors and people unpaid.

Awards
The motion theory award list:

See also
 Pixar
 DreamWorks SKG
 DreamWorks Animation
 Computer-generated imagery
 List of animation studios
 Stop-motion animation

References

External links 

 

American animation studios
Companies based in Los Angeles
American music video directors